The strange-tailed tyrant (Alectrurus risora) is a species of bird in the family Tyrannidae.

It is found in northeastern Argentina, Paraguay, Uruguay, and three small separated localities in southern Brazil.  Its natural habitat is subtropical, tropical, dry lowland, or grassland.

It is threatened by habitat loss, and is largely extirpated apart from the Iberá Wetlands where you can still see them occasionally. Approximately half of its range still exists in the north and northeast in southern Paraguay, northeastern Argentina, and western Uruguay.

References

External links
BirdLife Species Factsheet.
Strange-tailed tyrant photo gallery VIREO Photo--High Res
Photo-High Res; Article borderland-tours http://www.rincondelsocorro.com/en-us/actividades/avistaje-de-aves.htm

strange-tailed tyrant
Birds of Argentina
Birds of Paraguay
Birds of Uruguay
Birds of Brazil
strange-tailed tyrant
Taxa named by Louis Jean Pierre Vieillot
Taxonomy articles created by Polbot